Trechoblemus micros is a species of ground beetle in the Trechinae subfamily from insecta class .

Description
Beetle in length 4 mm. The upper body is reddish brown.

References

Beetles described in 1784
micros